Netlandsnes Chapel is a parish church of the Church of Norway in Kvinesdal Municipality in Agder county, Norway. It is one of the two churches for the Fjotland parish which is part of the Lister og Mandal prosti (deanery) in the Diocese of Agder og Telemark. The white, wooden church was built in a long church design in 1886 using plans drawn up by the architect H.A. Fedde. The church seats about 100 people.

See also
List of churches in Agder og Telemark

References

Kvinesdal
Churches in Agder
Wooden churches in Norway
19th-century Church of Norway church buildings
Churches completed in 1886
1886 establishments in Norway